Watkins Stained Glass Studio is a family-owned business that produces stained-glass art in Colorado.

History
Watkins Stained Glass Studio was founded as Clarence Watkins arrived in America. He came from a family of glass artists that stretches back from 17th century England. Clarence settled in Denver and started offering his services to churches, houses and mansions.

Watkins Glass Studio was added to Colorado's business directory in 1881. An estimated 70 percent of traditional stained glass art throughout churches, museums, mausoleums, bungalows, mansions and businesses in Denver are created and restored by the studio.

Selected works
Molly Brown House Museum
Castle Marne
Phipps Mansion
Colorado Convention Center
Brown Palace Hotel
Fairmount Cemetery

References

American stained glass artists and manufacturers